Sunday Encounter is the US title for a 1958 French comedy-drama film, Un drôle de dimanche. It was directed by Marc Allégret and stars Arletty, Bourvil and Danielle Darrieux with Jean-Paul Belmondo making an early appearance.

Plot

Cast 
 Bourvil as Jean Brévent 
 Danielle Darrieux  as Catherine Brévent  
 Arletty  as  Juliette Armier
 Cathia Caro as  Caroline Armier 
 Colette Richard  as  Mireille 
 Jean-Paul Belmondo  as Patrick 
 Jean Wall  as  M. Saunier 
 Roger Hanin  as  Robert Sartori 
 Jean Lefebvre  as  le concierge de l'agence
 Fernand Sardou  as  le brigadier
 Jean Ozenne  as  le représentant de l'agence
 Jean Carmet  as  le pompiste
 Nicolas Vogel  as  Chartier 
 André Philip  as  le gendarme attendant le bus
 Jean-Louis Allibert  as  le portier du Plaza 
 Olivier Darrieux  as  un copain de guerre
 Charles Bouillaud  as  le réceptionniste

References

External links

Film page at Le Film Guide

French comedy-drama films
1958 films
1950s French-language films
1950s French films